The Edgeworth Professor of Economics at the University of Oxford is named in honour of Francis Ysidro Edgeworth, the Drummond Professor of Political Economy from 1891 to 1922.

Incumbents
 James Mirrlees, 1969–1995
 Paul Klemperer, 1995–present

External links
 Oxford University Economics Department

Economics, Edgeworth
Nuffield College, Oxford
Economics, Edgeworth
Lists of people associated with the University of Oxford